Chris or Christopher Young may refer to:

Arts and entertainment
Christopher Young (born 1958), American music composer
Christopher Young (producer) (born 1959), Scottish television and film producer
Chris Young (actor) (born 1971), American film and television actor
Chris Young (musician) (born 1985), American country music singer
Chris Young (album), his self-titled debut album

Sports

Baseball
Chris Young (pitcher) (born 1979), American baseball pitcher
Chris Young (baseball coach) (born 1981), American baseball coach
Chris Young (outfielder) (born 1983), American baseball outfielder

Other sports
Chris Young (footballer, born 1886) (1886–1956), English footballer
Christopher Young (rugby league) (1945–2016), British rugby league footballer
Chris Devlin-Young (born 1961), American alpine skier
Chris Young (American football) (born 1980), American NFL football player

Others
Chris Taliutafa Young (fl. 1924), Samoan chief and claimant to the title Tui Manu'a

See also
Young (surname)
Chris Devlin-Young (born 1961), American alpine ski racer
Chris Yonge (b. 1991), a Canadian rapper and sound producer